Felimare sisalensis is a species of sea slug or dorid nudibranch, a marine gastropod mollusc in the family Chromodorididae.

Distribution 
This species was described from two specimens collected at  depth at Madagascar Reef, Campeche Bank, Yucatan, Mexico, .

References

Chromodorididae
Gastropods described in 2012